Khvosh Rud Rural District is a rural district (dehestan) in Bandpey-ye Gharbi District, Babol County, Mazandaran Province, Iran. At the 2006 census, its population was 11,758, in 3,143 families. The rural district has 57 villages.

References 

Rural Districts of Mazandaran Province
Babol County